State Road 202 (NM 202) is a  state highway in the US state of New Mexico. NM 202's western terminus is at U.S. Route 70 (US 70) northeast of Portales, and the eastern terminus is at Farm to Market Road 1760 (FM 1760) at the Texas state line.

Major intersections

See also

References

202
Transportation in Roosevelt County, New Mexico